The Geinitzinidae is an extinct family of Foraminifera from the late Paleozoic (U Dev. - U Perm) included in the Fusulinida that comprises genera characterized by unserial tests (chambers arranged in a single row, or line, in which walls are double layered. The outer layer is of light colored hyaline (glassy) radial calcite. The inner layer is a dark, secreted, microgranular calcite.

References

 Alfred R. Loeblich Jr and Helen Tappan,1988. Forminiferal Genera and their Classification. E-book 
 Geinitzinidae Paleobiology Database, 9 Mar 2013

Fusulinida
Foraminifera families
Prehistoric SAR supergroup families